Oristicta rosendaleorum is a species of damselfly belonging to the family Isostictidae. 
It was described by Theischinger and Burwell in 2017.
Until 2017 Oristicta filicicola was the only species of the genus Oristicta which has now been widened to include Oristicta rosendaleorum.
The common name suggested for the new species is elegant wiretail.

Description
Oristicta rosendaleorum is a slender and dull-coloured damselfly of medium-size with a length around 42mm, and hind-wing about 21mm . Differences when compared to Oristicta filicicola include richer black markings, altered patterns on the synthorax and abdominal segments,
and a lack of posterolateral processes/horns on the male pronotum. The anal appendages of the male take a different form also.

Distribution
As of 2017, five specimens have been collected from two locations, both within 20 km of Lakeland, Queensland, in north-eastern Australia.

References

Isostictidae
Odonata of Australia
Insects of Australia
Endemic fauna of Australia
Taxa named by Günther Theischinger
Taxa named by Chris Burwell
Insects described in 2017
Damselflies